Robbyn Terresa Lewis (born July 18, 1963) is an American politician who represents the 46th legislative district in the Maryland House of Delegates.

Background
Lewis attended public schools in Gary, Indiana and Chicago, Illinois and then earned a bachelor's degree in anthropology from the University of Chicago. In 1998, she was conferred a master's degree in Public Health from Columbia University.

Lewis was a Peace Corps volunteer in Niger from 1990 to 1991, research coordinator for the Bloomberg School of Public Health, The Johns Hopkins University in 1998, a consultant for Population Services International's Haiti Office in 1999, a program manager for the Cervical Cancer Prevention Program at the Johns Hopkins Program for International Education in Gynecology and Obstetrics from 2004 to 2006. She was the regional manager for West and South Africa, International Pregnancy Advisory Services from 2012 to 2014 and has served as a consultant for the Maryland Environmental Health Network and the Baltimore Tree Trust. She is a special assistant to the Maryland Health Exchange. On December 30, 2016, Maryland Governor Larry Hogan announced that he would accept the Democratic State Central Committee's recommendation and appointed her to the Maryland House of Delegates. Lewis was sworn in by House Speaker Michael E. Busch on January 10, 2017.

In the legislature

Lewis was appointed to the Environment and Transportation Committee and its Environment and Transportation and its Land Use and Ethics Subcommittees.Lewis is a member of the Baltimore City Delegation and the Legislative Black Caucus of Maryland.

References

Democratic Party members of the Maryland House of Delegates
Politicians from Baltimore
1963 births
Living people
University of Chicago alumni
21st-century American politicians
21st-century American women politicians
Peace Corps volunteers
African-American state legislators in Maryland
African-American women in politics
Women state legislators in Maryland
21st-century African-American women
21st-century African-American politicians
20th-century African-American people
20th-century African-American women